Henry Ashworth (1785–1811) was a British lieutenant in the Royal Navy.

Ashworth was born in London in December 1785. In November 1799, he entered on board the 38-gun frigate , under the immediate patronage of the first lieutenant, and four years later was serving as midshipman on board the same ship when she was lost on Île de Sein, near Brest, on 8 February 1804. Whilst a prisoner of war, Ashworth made several remarkable attempts to recover his freedom, and at last, having escaped from Bitche in December 1808, he succeeded in passing through Germany to Trieste, where he went on board the English frigate L'Unité. Ashworth had command of one of the boats sent to rescue these drowning wretches, and, whilst so employed, received a wound, of which he died a month later on 25 July 1811, at Menorca.

References

1785 births
1811 deaths
Military personnel from London
19th-century English people
Royal Navy officers
Royal Navy personnel of the Napoleonic Wars
Escapees from French detention
British military personnel killed in action in the Napoleonic Wars